Barkly East (Afrikaans: Barkly-Oos) is a town in Eastern Cape Province, South Africa, seat of the Joe Gqabi District Municipality, and 117 km by road E.S.E. of Aliwal North, lying in the mountainous area just south of Lesotho. The town lies at the southern tip of the Drakensberg on the Langkloofspruit, a tributary of the Kraai River which, in turn is a tributary of the Orange River at an elevation of 1 790 meter (5 873 foot) above sealevel. Barkly East is characterized by rugged mountains and green valleys. Snow falls in winter, and the hamlet of Rhodes is 60 km or an hour's drive from Barkly East on the R396. Both are within the boundaries of the Senqu Local Municipality.

It has been one of the few areas in South Africa where winter sports are pursued, and in summer fly fishing for Rainbow trout and indigenous Smallmouth yellowfish, trail running, mountain biking, ancient rock-art, tennis and the magnificent scenery draw tourists to the district. A recent development is the mountainous terrain attracting off-road bikers who revel in traversing the numerous passes in the area. Even more recent is the opening of the winter fly fishing season on Wild Trout Association waters around Barkly East, Lady Grey, Rhodes and Wartrail. ulutsha luyaphela yi 777

Xhosa and Afrikaans are spoken by most of the inhabitants, while English and some Sotho are also spoken. The primary economic base of the district is sheep-farming, the pasturage being excellent.

History
Like Barkly West, the town is named after Sir Henry Barkly, governor of the Cape Colony from 1870 to 1877. On 14 December 1874 the then-Governor, Sir Henry Barkly proclaimed that a town could split from Wodehouse.

Among the first families that settled in Barkly East were the Nels, Bothas, Oliviers, Murrays, Smits, Sephtons, Giddys, Isteds, Orpens, Nortons, Greyvensteins, Stapelbergs, Vorsters and the Jouberts and Cloetes of Constantia. But it was a Mr HS Nel who was the first white person that settled in this area.

Mary Edith Robertson was the first woman to be elected the town's deputy mayor for two years and in 1988 she was the first citizen to be awarded the Freedom of the Town for her services to the community.  She was the also the first woman town councilor in the Barkly East history and held this post for eight years.

The area is well known for excellent trout fishing. A variety of caves contain rock paintings by the San that date back hundreds of years, and visitors interested in San art can stay at cottages on local farms.

The Cloete-Joubert Hospital

The Provincial hospital in Barkly East is a living monument for Mr. Piet Joubert by his wife who was a Cloete and daughter of one of the wealthiest cattle farmers in South Africa, CWP Cloete of Glen Almond. The Joubert couple had no children, and after her death she intended to donate her money to a hospital. But Mr. Greyvenstein, who was her lawyer, persuaded her to keep the Cloete money in the area. As such, a small hospital was planned. The total cost of the hospital was £100 000 of which £80 000 came from the Joubert couple. The hospital was opened by the minister Sauer and by Dollie Cloete (the granddaughter of CWP Cloete by his first wife).

Geography

Climate
Barkly East has a subtropical highland climate (Cwb, according to the Köppen climate classification), with mild summers and chilly, dry winters, with occasional snowfalls. It borders on a cold semi-arid climate (BSk).

See also
 Barkly West
 Wodehouse

References

External links
Barkly East Community Tourism organisation
Wartrail & New England tourism
Wild Trout Association, Rhodes-based fly fishing organisation

Populated places in the Senqu Local Municipality
Populated places established in 1873